Broadmeadow railway station is a major regional interchange located on the Main North Line. The station itself serves the Newcastle suburb of Broadmeadow. The station was first opened on 15 August 1887.

The island platform was accessed by a level crossing at the station's northern end until replaced by an underpass on 2 March 1973 opened by Minister for Transport Milton Morris. The station was upgraded to wheelchair accessibility in July 2017.

Following the electrification of the line from Wyong in June 1984, passenger trains including the Brisbane Limited, Gold Coast Motorail, Grafton Express, North Coast Daylight Express, North Coast Overnight Express, Northern Mail and Northern Tablelands Express changed from electric to diesel traction at Broadmeadow.

Platforms & services
Broadmeadow has three platforms. It is serviced by NSW TrainLink Central Coast & Newcastle Line services travelling from Sydney Central to Newcastle.

It is also serviced by NSW TrainLink Xplorer and XPT long-distance services from Sydney to Armidale, Moree, Grafton, Casino and Brisbane, as well as daily coach services to Taree. These coach services are operated by Busways as routes 150 and 151.

Track Layout

Transport links
Newcastle Transport operates four routes via Broadmeadow station:
21: Broadmeadow to Newcastle East via Merewether
25: Broadmeadow to Charlestown via Kotara
27: Broadmeadow to Wallsend via University of Newcastle
28: Newcastle West to Mount Hutton via Newcastle Interchange & Broadmeadow

Signal boxes
The Australian Rail Track Corporation's Broadmeadow Centralised Traffic Control centre for the northern half of the state including the North Coast line to Brisbane, is located just south of the station, as is Transport Asset Holding Entity's Broadmeadow signal box which controls the Broadmeadow to Eraring section of the Main Northern line.

Yard
South of the station lies the extensive Broadmeadow yard. NSW TrainLink have a depot that maintains its Endeavour and Hunter railcar fleet. The former Broadmeadow Locomotive Depot is used to house preserved rolling stock.

References

External links

Broadmeadow station details Transport for New South Wales

Easy Access railway stations in New South Wales
Railway stations in the Hunter Region
Railway stations in Australia opened in 1887
Regional railway stations in New South Wales
Short-platform railway stations in New South Wales, 6 cars
Main North railway line, New South Wales